Stop & Listen is the fourth studio solo album by Bethany Dillon, and was released in 2009. It reached No. 29 in the US Christian Album Charts the song "Everyone to Know" reached No. 44 in the US Charts.

Critical reception 
Stop & Listen received the following reviews:

AllMusic gave the album a three and a half star rating and was an AMG music pick. It said that the album was another noteworthy effort by the acoustic pop artist. Allmusic also proclaimed her as a master of her folk-pop sound and utilizes it well to convey powerful faith-based messages on this record. It also chose the songs "Everyone To Know", "Stop & Listen", and "Reach Out" as the track picks off of the album.

Jesusfreakhideout gave the album a three and a half star rating, calling the album a careful, heartfelt collection of sweet melodies and worshipful lyrics that chronicle her spiritual growth.

Track listing 
 "Get Up and Walk" – 5:24
 "Everyone to Know" – 3:05
 "I Am Yours" – 4:16
 "Stop and Listen" – 4:21
 "Say Your Name" – 4:14
 "So Close" – 4:20
 "Reach Out" – 4:05
 "Deliver Me" – 5:09
 "The Way I come to You" – 4:20
 "In the Beginning" – 3:26
 "Everyone to Know" (acoustic) featuring Shane Barnard

References 

Bethany Dillon albums
2009 albums